Lophopoeum is a genus of beetles in the family Cerambycidae, containing the following species:

 Lophopoeum bituberculatum (White, 1855)
 Lophopoeum bruchi Monné & Martins, 1976
 Lophopoeum carinatulum Bates, 1863
 Lophopoeum centromaculatum Monné & Martins, 1976
 Lophopoeum circumflexum Bates, 1863
 Lophopoeum forsteri Tippmann, 1960
 Lophopoeum freudei (Gilmour, 1959)
 Lophopoeum fuliginosum Bates, 1863
 Lophopoeum humerosum Monné & Martins, 1976
 Lophopoeum meridianum Fisher, 1938
 Lophopoeum monticulum Monné & Martins, 1976
 Lophopoeum saronotum Bates, 1872
 Lophopoeum scopiferum Bates, 1872
 Lophopoeum timbouvae Lameere, 1884
 Lophopoeum w-flavum Bates, 1885

References

 
Acanthocinini